Crayon Pop is a South Korean girl group formed by Chrome Entertainment in 2012. The discography consists of two studio albums, four extended plays, twelve singles and twelve music videos. Members Choa and Way have also released an extended play, The 1st Mini Album, as Crayon Pop – Strawberry Milk.

Albums

Studio albums

Video albums

Extended plays

Singles

Other charted songs

Music videos

Strawberry Milk discography

Extended plays

Singles

Music videos

Notes

References

External links
 Official Korean website 
 Official Japanese website 

Discography
Discographies of South Korean artists
K-pop music group discographies